Eyraud is a surname. Notable people with the surname include: 

Eugène Eyraud (1820–1868), lay friar
Jacques-Henri Eyraud (born 1968), French businessman
Marc Eyraud (1924–2005), French film actor
Óscar Eyraud Adams ( 1986– 2020), Mexican indigenous activist